David S. Eaglin is a United States Air Force brigadier general who serves as the deputy commander of the Seventh Air Force. Previously, he was the vice director of operations of the North American Aerospace Defense Command.

In February 2021, he was assigned to take command of the 18th Wing, replacing Joel Carey.

References

External links
 

Year of birth missing (living people)
Living people
Place of birth missing (living people)
United States Air Force generals